The men's triple jump event  at the 1991 IAAF World Indoor Championships was held on 9 and 10 March.

Medalists

Results

Qualification

Final

References

Triple
Triple jump at the World Athletics Indoor Championships